The expression 'launching satellites' (Pinyin: 'fang weixing'), alternatively translated as "putting satellites into orbit", refers to a socialist construction campaign that began in 1958 during the "Great Leap Forward" and was anxious for success by 1959. During the Great Leap Forward, exaggeration was prevalent throughout China, with false reports exaggerating food production, and these false reports of "wheat satellites", "rice satellites", "grain satellites", "tobacco satellites", and other similar acts in various industries were unanimously called "Launching Satellites".

The term "launching satellites" was coined in honor of Sputnik 1, the first artificial Earth satellite launched by the USSR.

China successfully launched a sounding rocket in 1964 and the satellite Dong Fang Hong I in 1970.

See also
 Great Leap Forward
 Exceeding the UK, catching the USA
 Chinese space program

References

1950s in China
Campaigns of the Chinese Communist Party
Economic history of the People's Republic of China
Great Leap Forward